ITC may stand for:

Companies and corporations 
Illinois Terminal Company, US railroad, reporting mark
ITC or ITC Entertainment, British TV company
International Typeface Corporation, now a subsidiary of Monotype Imaging
ITC Transmission, electric transmission company, Michigan, USA
Information Terminals Corporation, predecessor to Verbatim Corporation
 Ishikawa TV, a Japanese commercial broadcaster

Tobacco companies 
ITC (company), formerly Indian Tobacco Company, India
ITC Hotels
Iranian Tobacco Company

Organizations 
Independent Transport Commission, UK research charity
International Test Commission, Association to promote effective psychological testing and assessment policies
United States International Trade Commission, federal agency of the United States
International Tin Council, former organisation for tin producers in Cornwall and Malaysia
International Trade Centre, a joint agency of the WTO and the UN
Israel Tennis Centers
Committee of Union and Progress (İttihad ve Terakki Cemiyeti)

Science 
Isothermal titration calorimetry
Intertropical Convergence Zone (abbreviated ITC or ITCZ)
International Teletraffic Congress, a communications research and collaboration group
Indirect-threaded code, a compiler implementation technique
Intercalated cells of the amygdala, a group of GABAergic neurons in the amygdala
 Isothiocyanate, a chemical group found in compounds that contribute to a healthy diet

Education and research 
Illinois Technical College, a private junior college in Chicago, Illinois from 1950 to 1992
Institute of Technology of Cambodia, located in Phnom Penh, Cambodia
Institute of Technology, Carlow, a Regional Technical College, located south of Carlow, Ireland
Instituto Tecnológico de Córdoba, an organization promoting technological development in 	Córdoba, Argentina
Institute of Texan Cultures, a museum and library located in HemisFair Park in downtown San Antonio, Texas
International Teledemocracy Centre, part of Edinburgh Napier University, dedicated to researching e-participation and e-democracy systems
ITC Enschede, the International Institute for Geoinformation Science and Earth Observation, a tertiary educational institution located in Enschede, Netherlands
ITC Sangeet Research Academy, a Hindustani classical music academy run by ITC Limited, located in Kolkata, India
ITC SRA Sangeet Sammelan, an annual Indian classical music festival

Religion and theology 
International Teaching Centre, an appointed body of the Bahá'í Administrative Order located at the Bahá'í World Centre in Haifa
Interdenominational Theological Center, a consortium of denominational seminaries located in Atlanta, Georgia
International Theological Commission, a group of Roman Catholic theologians

Sport 
The International Technical Committee of the Offshore Racing Congress
International Touring Car Championship, the 1995/1996 version of the Deutsche Tourenwagen Meisterschaft

Other uses 
Independent Television Commission, UK TV regulator 1991-2003
Interagency Training Center, a U.S. National Security Agency facility
Instrumental transcommunication, a form of Electronic voice phenomena (EVP)
Investment tax credit